Arthur's Town Airport  is an airport in Arthur's Town on Cat Island in the Bahamas.

Charter flights
Aeroshares Charter, LLC services Cat Island from worldwide locations.

Charter service is also available from Florida or Nassau.

References

Airports in the Bahamas
Cat Island, Bahamas